Jack Daly (28 May 1915 – 5 May 1988) was a Fine Gael politician from County Kerry in Ireland. For many years he was a member of Seanad Éireann.

The founder and managing director of the motor vehicle business ″Killarney Autos″ (Killarney, County Kerry), Daly was elected to the 13th Seanad on 23 April 1975, at a by-election on the Industrial and Commercial Panel following the death of Senator Denis Farrelly. He was defeated at the 1977 Seanad election, and again at the 1981 election, but was re-elected at the 1982 election to the 16th Seanad. He held the seat until his death in 1988, aged nearly 73. The resulting by-election for his seat in the 18th Seanad was won by the Fianna Fáil candidate Tony Bromell.

In the Seanad, Daly was a consistent advocate for the interests of the motor industry in Ireland, and served for many years on the council of the Society of the Irish Motor Industry. At the time of his death, he was opposition Chief Whip in the Seanad.

References

1915 births
1988 deaths
Fine Gael senators
Members of the 13th Seanad
Members of the 16th Seanad
Members of the 17th Seanad
Members of the 18th Seanad
Local councillors in County Kerry